The Machinere are an indigenous people of Brazil, Bolivia, and Peru. They live along the Acre River in Bolivia. In Brazil they mostly live in the Mamoadate Indigenous Territory, although some live in the Chico Mendes Extractivist Reserve, both in Acre.

Name
Besides Machinere, they are also called Machineri, Manchinere, Manchineri, Manitenére, Manitenerí, and Maxinéri.

Language
Machinere people speak the Machinere language, which is a Piro language and part of the Southern Maipuran language family. It is written in the Latin script. The Bible was translated in Machinere in 1960. The language is highly similar to the Yine language.

Economy and subsistence
Machinere people hunt, fish, and farm using the swidden method. They grow crops of maize, manioc, rice, papaya, peanut, pumpkin, sugarcane, and sweet potato.

Notes

Indigenous peoples in Bolivia
Indigenous peoples in Brazil
Indigenous peoples in Peru
Indigenous peoples of the Amazon